The Black Women Oral History Project consists of interviews with 72 African American women from 1976 to 1981, conducted under the auspices of the Schlesinger Library of Radcliffe College, now Radcliffe Institute for Advanced Study.

Project background 
Beginning in 1977, Ruth Edmonds Hill coordinated and devoted herself to the completion of the project and to creating awareness of the rich information contained in the transcripts. The project began with the goal of capturing the lives and stories of women of African descent, many already in their 70s, 80s and 90s. On the recommendation of Dr. Letitia Woods Brown, professor of history at George Washington University, and with funding secured from the Rockefeller Foundation, the project began to address what Brown noted as inadequate documentation of the stories of African-American women in the Schlesinger Library and at other centers for research.

The project sought a cross section of women who had made significant contributions to American society in the first half of the twentieth century.  Many interviewees had professional careers in such fields as education, government, the arts, business, medicine, law and social work.  Others combined care for their families with volunteer work at the local, regional, or national level. Most of the interviews explored topics such as family background, education and training, employment, voluntary activities, and family and personal life. The intention was to give the interviewee the opportunity to explore and reflect on the influences and events that shaped her life.

Participants 
Among the participants were Melnea Cass, Zelma George, Dorothy Height, Queen Mother Moore, Rosa Parks, Esther Mae Scott, Muriel S. Snowden, and Dorothy West.

Volume 2 of the published work features conversations with Sadie Alexander, Elizabeth Barker, and Etta Moten Barnett.

Volume 3 includes interviews with Juanita Craft, Alice Dunnigan, and Eva B. Dykes, while Volume 10 features Charleszetta Waddles, Dorothy West, and Addie Williams.

All of the interviews are open for research with digitized materials, with the exception of the following: Merze Tate whose interview is not yet complete and five interviews that remain closed until 2027: Kathleen Adams, Margaret Walker Alexander, Lucy Miller Mitchell, Ruth Janetta Temple, and Era Bell Thompson.

Methodology 
The interviews were recorded on audiotape and transcribed and each interviewee was given an opportunity to edit and correct the transcript prior to the final printing.  Both the transcripts and audiotapes have been archived and preserved at the Schlesinger Library.
Copies of these materials are also held in the Sophia Smith Collection at Smith College and include the published guide to the transcripts; also the summary of each woman's life and highlights of topics from their interviews, as well as an index.
Furthermore, the interviews and transcripts have been digitized and are available from the Schlesinger Library collection through the Black Women Oral History Project finding aid.

Related projects 
In 1981, Judith Sedwick offered to create portraits of a few of the interviewees, and later, with additional grant funding, photographed many more.  The result is a collection of stunning photographs, which became a traveling exhibition, first shown in 1984 at the New York Public Library. All of these photographs are also catalogued at Harvard's Visual Information Access (VIA) database and available to view as a collection under "Black Women Oral History".

References

External links 

 Black Women Oral History Project
 Interviews of the Black Women Oral History Project.
 Schlesinger Library, Radcliffe Institute, Harvard University.
 Black Women Oral History Project. Sophia Smith Collection. Smith College. Five Colleges Archive and Manuscript Collection.
 http://www.libsci.sc.edu/histories/georgia/statehistory/Oral_History_Project.PDF

 
History of women in the United States
African-American women
Post–civil rights era in African-American history
Oral history
Radcliffe College and Institute